Magaz de Cepeda is a municipality located in the province of León, Castile and León, Spain. According to the 2010 census (INE), the municipality has a population of 412 inhabitants.

Magaz  is part of the historical region of La Cepeda.

Villages
Benamarías
Magaz de Cepeda
Porqueros
Vanidodes
Vega de Magaz
Zacos

References

External links 
La Maragatería y Cepeda

Municipalities in the Province of León
La Cepeda